Emma Dabiri (born 25 March 1979) is an Irish author, academic, and broadcaster. Her debut book, Don't Touch My Hair, was published in 2019.

Biography 
Dabiri was born in Dublin to an Irish mother and a Nigerian Yoruba father. After spending her early years in Atlanta, Georgia, her family returned to Dublin when Dabiri was five years of age. She says that her experience of growing up isolated and as the target of frequent racism informed her perspective (2019). After school she moved to London to study African Studies at the School of Oriental and African Studies, her academic career leading to broadcast work, including  co-presenting BBC Four's Britain's Lost Masterpieces, Channel 4 documentaries such as Is Love Racist?, and a radio show about Afrofuturism, among others.

Dabiri is a frequent contributor to print and online media, including The Guardian, Irish Times, Dublin Inquirer, Vice, and others. She has also published in academic journals. Dabiri's outspokenness on issues of race and racism has caused her to have to deal with extreme "trollism" and racist abuse online. She says of this that "it's just words" and the racism she grew up with fortified her to deal with it. She is the author of two books: Don't Touch My Hair (2019) and What White People Can Do Next: From Allyship to Coalition (2021).

Dabiri holds a Western Marxist's critique of capitalism, and in What White People Can Do Next, she dedicates a chapter to "Interrogate Capitalism", building upon the ideas of Herbert Marcuse, Angela Davis, and Frantz Fanon. Western Marxism places greater emphasis on the study of the cultural trends of capitalist society. Dabiri summarizes: "In fact, in many ways race and capitalism are siblings", while "capitalism exists, racism will continue".

Dabiri lives in London, where she is completing her PhD in Visual Sociology at Goldsmiths while also teaching at SOAS and continuing her broadcast work. She is married and has two children.

Dabiri has appeared on the television programmes Have I Got News For You and Portrait Artist of the Year.

Don't Touch My Hair (2019) 
In her 2019 book Don't Touch My Hair, Dabiri combines memoir with social commentary and philosophy. She moves beyond the personal to examine African hair in wider contexts, with the book travelling across geographical space and through time to take in pre-colonial Africa up to modern day Western society. Throughout she writes that African hair represents a complex visual language. The review by Charlie Brinkhurst-Cuff in The Guardian summed up Don't Touch My Hair by saying: "The first title of its kind, with fresh ideas and a vivid sense of purpose, Dabiri's book is groundbreaking."

What White People Can Do Next: From Allyship to Coalition (2021) 

As described by TIME magazine, "What White People Can Do Next: From Allyship to Coalition is Dabiri's manifesto for radical change in a world impacted by the pandemic and the surge of attention on the Black Lives Matter movement last summer. With essays titled 'Stop the Denial,' 'Interrogate Capitalism,' and 'Denounce the White Saviour,' Dabiri marries historical context with contemporary commentary and analysis in a direct, accessible style, referencing thinkers including Fred Moten, Angela Davis, Audre Lorde and bell hooks."

Bibliography 
 Don't Touch My Hair, London: Allen Lane (an imprint of Penguin), 2019. Hardback  Ebook 
 What White People Can Do Next: From Allyship to Coalition, Penguin, 2021. .

References

External links 
 

Living people
1979 births
21st-century Irish non-fiction writers
21st-century Irish women writers
Alumni of SOAS University of London
Black Irish people
Irish expatriates in England
Irish expatriates in the United States
Irish people of Nigerian descent
Irish people of Yoruba descent
Irish radio presenters
Irish television presenters
Irish women non-fiction writers
Irish women television presenters
Television personalities from Dublin (city)
Irish women radio presenters
Writers from Dublin (city)
Yoruba women television personalities
Yoruba women writers